Rodney Thompson is a game designer whose writing credits include numerous books for the Star Wars Roleplaying Game and the Dungeons & Dragons fantasy role-playing game. He was the lead developer for the 4th edition version of the Dark Sun campaign setting.

Bibliography

Wizards of the Coast

d20 Modern
d20 Future
d20 Future Tech

Dungeons & Dragons

3rd edition
Dragon Magic

4th Edition
Dark Sun Campaign Setting
Heroes of the Fallen Lands
Heroes of the Forgotten Kingdoms
Monster Vault
Player's Option: Heroes of the Feywild

Star Wars Roleplaying Game

Revised Core Rulebook edition
Hero's Guide

Saga Edition
Star Wars Roleplaying Game: Saga Edition 
Starships of the Galaxy (Saga Edition) 
Star Wars Gamemaster Screen 
Threats of the Galaxy 
Knights of the Old Republic Campaign Guide 
Force Unleashed Campaign Guide 
Scum and Villainy 
The Clone Wars Campaign Guide 
Legacy Era Campaign Guide
Jedi Academy Training Manual 
Rebellion Era Campaign Guide 
Galaxy At War 
Scavenger's Guide to Droids 
Galaxy of Intrigue 
The Unknown Regions

Green Ronin Publishing

Generic d20
The Noble's Handbook
Dirge of the Damned

Future
Future Players Companion

Freeport Setting
Crisis in Freeport
Buccaneers in Freeport

Alderac Entertainment Group
Stargate SG-1 Role Playing Game

Board games
 Tyrants of the Underdark
 Lords of Waterdeep
 Dungeon Command

Scratchpad Publishing
Dusk City Outlaws 
Spectaculars

Media Mentions
Rodney Thompson has appeared in the following newspaper and magazine articles, websites and podcasts.

Podcasts
 Order 66 podcast: Thompson has appeared on the following twelve episodes discussing aspects of the Star Wars Saga Edition roleplaying game: April 6, 2008  (The Third GM), May 18, 2008  (When Vader Attacks), July 14, 2008  (Worst Show Ever), November 17, 2008  (The Answer to the Ultimate Question of Life, The Scum of the Universe and Everything), January 12, 2009  (One Year of the Big O!), January 26, 2009  (Grand Rodney of the Republic), March 22, 2009  (Three Men and a Little Legacy), May 10, 2009  (Execute Episode 66), June 1, 2009  (Educating You In The Face), September 2, 2009  (Rodney's Rebel Field Guide), September 28, 2009  (Galaxy at War), December 21, 2009  (BOOM! Infinite Oregano).

References

External links
 
 Rodney Thompson's Blog at wizards.com
 Rodney Thompson Product Listing on RPG.net

1980 births
Dungeons & Dragons game designers
Living people
People from Chattanooga, Tennessee